Mark Mapletoft is a former rugby union international who represented England in one test against Argentina in 1997. Mapletoft represented England at A, U21 and U18 levels. He was also a reserve for the Coventry football team.

Early life
Mark Mapletoft was born on 25 December 1971 in Mansfield.

Rugby union career
Mapletoft joined Gloucester in 1994 from Rugby Lions as a full-back but made the move to fly-half under coach Richard Hill after recovering from a serious knee injury. He made his only international appearance on 7 June 1997 at Ferrocaril Oeste, Buenos Aires in the Argentina vs England match. Argentina won the match 33 to 13. Mapletoft was a popular figure at Gloucester RFC, where he helped keep them in the top division in the 1997-98 season and he was known for his cheeky flair and inspired breaks. He scored 11 tries for Gloucester and scored over 450 points. Many of the top clubs wanted his signature and his desire to play at number 10, when Gloucester saw him reverting to full back lead to a move to Harlequins. Injuries meant he was not always at his best but he went on to continue to have a solid club career ending his playing days at London Irish. He was overlooked at international level because Rob Andrew was the mainstay of the England side and the emergence of Johnny Wilkinson meant he was unable to secure a place at the highest level. He scored 6 tries and scored over 450 points for Irish before retiring and taking a role with the RFU Academy.  While coaching at Saracens, he played amateur rugby for Hertford RFC. He has recently agreed a coaching position with his former team Harlequins.

References

1971 births
Living people
Alumni of Loughborough University
English rugby union coaches
English rugby union players
England international rugby union players
Rugby union fly-halves
Loughborough Students RUFC players
Gloucester Rugby players
Saracens F.C. players
Harlequin F.C. players
London Irish players
Rugby union players from Mansfield